Melissa Ranger (born 1981) was a Canadian international lawn bowler.

She won a silver medal in the fours with Shirley Fitzpatrick-Wong, Andrea Weigand and Anita Nivala at the 1998 Commonwealth Games in Kuala Lumpur. 

She bowls for Alberta and is a twice Canadian national champion.

References

Living people
1981 births
Bowls players at the 2002 Commonwealth Games
Canadian female bowls players
Commonwealth Games medallists in lawn bowls
Commonwealth Games silver medallists for Canada
21st-century Canadian women
Medallists at the 2002 Commonwealth Games